Hong Kong Disneyland Hotel is the second Disney hotel in the Hong Kong Disneyland Resort in Penny's Bay, Lantau Island, Hong Kong. The theme of the hotel is of a Victorian style, and is located near Disneyland Harbour. The hotel is built on reclaimed land and opened on 12 September 2005.

The hotel has 400 guestrooms and a convention centre with ballrooms and function rooms.

The Convention Centre offers three ballrooms.

It is in Islands District.

Culture
"Micktorian" architecture style, a blend of "Mickey" with "Victorian", was adopted by the hotel. For example, "hidden Mickey" is gossiped to be found behind the Mickey-eared silhouette, such as carpet design and dinnerware. This specific design is interpreted as feng shui in Cantonese culture.

Warmth is another magic of the hotel. The hotel service specialized in "wake-up calls" and "character greeting", which shred its focus not only on the parents, but also on the children and their grandparents.

Walt Disney Imagineering mainly drew these two design elements from Disney's Grand Floridian Resort and Spa at the Walt Disney World Resort, as well as the Disneyland Hotel at Disneyland Paris. Students from invited institutions can apply for either of the following section in ImagiNations Hong Kong Semiar 2017, Community Built Playground, or Family Storytelling, the Neighborhood Developmental Project. Result will be announced in January 2018.

Dining

There are five restaurants in the hotel.

Shopping
The hotel has one shop located on the lobby next to the main entrance. The shop sells drinks, park merchandise, toys and T-shirts. It is slightly Victorian themed, like the hotel itself.

Facilities
There are 2 pools in the resort, 1 indoors and 1 outdoors. The hotel also offers other facilities including a tennis court, a multi-function court, a Mickey-shaped maze and a grass field in which some kids activities take place in. The hotel also has a Victorian Spa which contains a gym. Every day and evening a talented jazz band plays in the main area of the hotel.

See also

Disney's Hollywood Hotel
Disney Explorers Lodge
Hong Kong Disneyland Resort
Hong Kong Disneyland
Sunny Bay station
Disneyland Resort line
Airport Express (MTR)
Hong Kong International Airport
Hong Kong International Theme Parks
 Hong Kong government 
 The Walt Disney Company
 Walt Disney Parks and Resorts
Walt Disney Imagineering

References

External links
Official Website

Hotels in Hong Kong Disneyland Resort
Hotels established in 2005
Hotel buildings completed in 2005
2005 establishments in Hong Kong

it:Disneyland Hotel#Hong Kong Disneyland Resort